Marshall Lewis Johnston  (20 July 1923 – 31 October 2017) was an Australian public servant and diplomat.

Johnston enlisted in the Australian Army in 1941, during World War II.

In June 1980 Johnston was appointed an Officer of the Order of Australia in recognition of his public service as a diplomatic representative.

Johnston retired from public service in 1984, his final post was as Australian Ambassador to Greece (1980–1984) and the non-resident High Commissioner to Cyprus (1980-1982). He died in October 2017 at the age of 94.

References

|-

|-

1923 births
2017 deaths
Ambassadors of Australia to Cambodia
Ambassadors of Australia to Greece
High Commissioners of Australia to Cyprus
Ambassadors of Australia to Iran
Ambassadors of Australia to Israel
Ambassadors of Australia to Myanmar
Ambassadors of Australia to Thailand
Officers of the Order of Australia
People from Canberra
Australian Army personnel of World War II